Cauldron Linn, or Caldron Linn, is a waterfall on the River Devon on the border between Clackmannanshire and Perth and Kinross in Scotland.

Location and description
Caldron Linn is about a mile below Rumbling Bridge, and  can be accessed through fields by Powmill, with a 150 ft slippery descent to reach it. The height of its fall was lessened in 1886 by rock fall.

The Scottish Tourist, an 1838 guidebook, says of the waterfall:

The water flow of the Linn is now much diminished by a recent hydro-electric scheme.

History

The Linn was famously visited by Robert Burns in 1787 in the company of his friends Gavin Hamilton and Crauford Tait of Harvireston.

See also
Waterfalls of Scotland

Notes

External links
photo

Waterfalls of Perth and Kinross
Waterfalls of Clackmannanshire